Mocha Island is a small Chilean island located west of the coast of Arauco Province in the Pacific Ocean. In Mapuche mythology, the souls of dead people travel west to visit this island. The island today is home to the Mocha Island National Reserve, a nature reserve that covers approximately 45% of the island's surface. The island is noted as the location of numerous historic shipwrecks. The waters off the island are a popular place for recreational sea fishing.

The Pacific degu (Octodon pacificus), also known as the Mocha Island degu, a species of rodent in the family Octodontidae, is endemic to Mocha Island.

Geology
Geologically, the island is made of sedimentary rock stratum of Ranquil Formation, a formation whose main outcrops lie in the continent. The island was permanently uplifted as result of the 2010 Chile earthquake but this uplift was less than in the adjacent coast where Tirúa had the largest uplift of all the coast. The existence of a splay fault called Tirúa-Mocha Fault may explain the different behaviour of Mocha Island relative to the mainland during this earthquake.

History

The island was historically inhabited by an indigenous coastal population of Mapuches known as the Lafkenches. The first European to document Mocha was Juan Bautista Pastene on September 10, 1544, who named it Isla de San Nicolas de Tolentino.

According to Juan Ignacio Molina, the Dutch captain Joris van Spilbergen observed the use of chilihueques (a South American camelid) by native Mapuches of Mocha Island as plough animals in 1614.

Mocha Island was regularly visited by pirates and privateers from the Netherlands and England. Francis Drake and Olivier van Noort are known to have used the island as a supply base. When Drake was visiting it during his circumnavigation of the globe he was seriously hurt by Mapuches that inhabited the island. Richard Hawkins, Drake's cousin, also passed with his ship the Dainty. Eventually the Mapuche on the island were transported in 1685, from Mocha Island by Governor José de Garro to a reducción on the plain on the right bank of the Bio Bio River called the Valley of Mocha that later became the location of the modern city of Concepción, Chile.

The waters off the island are also noted as the home to a famous 19th century sperm whale, Mocha Dick as depicted by American explorer and author Jeremiah N. Reynolds who published an account, "Mocha Dick: Or The White Whale of the Pacific: A Leaf from a Manuscript Journal" in May, 1839 in The Knickerbocker magazine in New York. Mocha Dick was, in part, the inspiration for the fictional whale Moby Dick in the 1851 novel Moby-Dick by Herman Melville.

Polynesian contact
In December 2007 several human skulls with Polynesian features, such as a pentagonal shape when viewed from behind, were found lying on a shelf in a museum in Concepción. These skulls originated from Mocha Island.

References

Sources
 Francisco Solano Asta-Buruaga y Cienfuegos, Diccionario geográfico  de la República de Chile, SEGUNDA EDICIÓN CORREGIDA Y AUMENTADA, NUEVA YORK, D. APPLETON Y COMPAÑÍA. 1899.  pg. 449–450 Mocha (Isla de)

External links
 
 

Islands of Biobío Region
Archaeological sites in Chile
Pre-Columbian trans-oceanic contact
Pacific islands of Chile
Pirates
Coasts of Biobío Region
Populated coastal places in Chile